Damian Mori (born 30 September 1970) is an Australian former football player who is an assistant coach for Adelaide United. He won two Johnny Warren Medals, awarded to the best player in the Australian league and was top scorer on 5 occasions.  He established a reputation as a pacy, poaching goalscorer, which is notable for a player who started his career as a defender.

Early and personal life
Mori was born in Box Hill North, Victoria in 1970. His father, Joseph Mori, was a footballer who emigrated from Slovenia. His paternal grandfather was of Italian ancestry.

Club career 

Mori was successful at club level – mainly in the Australian domestic league. After developing into Adelaide City's most important and best player, he spent a single season (1996–97) overseas in Germany with Borussia Mönchengladbach. This move was characterised only by frustration. He appeared in only six games, and never played more than half a match. In those six games, he didn't score once. Mori returned home to become NSL Top Goalscorer the following season.

In 1996, Mori held the world record for the fastest goal after he scored for City in just 3.69 seconds, straight from the kick-off, in a 2–2 draw with Sydney United.

In 2000, Mori transferred to Perth Glory and enjoyed great success. The striking partnership with Bobby Despotovski was renowned as one of the most potent in the competition. Mori won the NSL championship in 2002–03, scoring in the Grand Final. He was also part of the 2003–04 Perth Glory championship side.

Following the end of the National Soccer League in 2004 he moved back to Adelaide City to play and coach in the South Australian Premier League. He was extremely successful here, winning the "Coach of the Year" award. However, many were surprised at the fact that the NSL all-time top goalscorer was not on the shortlist of any A-League club.

It later emerged that a major stumbling block was Mori's desire for a part-time contract to allow him to manage business interests in Adelaide. Prior to round four of the A-League season, it was announced that Perth Glory had signed Mori on a short-term contract to replace injured defender David Tarka.  Mori subsequently came on as a substitute in the Glory's 1 – 0 away win over the New Zealand Knights on 22 September 2005. After some excellent displays, particularly a brace against Newcastle United Jets and a hat-trick against Adelaide United, the club strongly desired a permanent deal. After some wrangling with Adelaide City chairman Bob D'Ottavi, Mori agreed to a one-year deal.

On 9 December 2005, it was announced that Mori would be appointed as assistant manager at Perth Glory. This appointment followed the elevation of Alan Vest to Manager after the departure of Steve McMahon. After the completion of the 2005–06 A-League season, Mori returned to Adelaide City as player-manager.

On 27 September 2006, Mori signed with the Central Coast Mariners on a short-term deal to cover the loss of Nik Mrdja which was extended once. After the short-term contract with the Mariners had expired, the FFA did not allow Central Coast to re-sign him. On 21 November 2006, he was approached by new Queensland Roar manager Frank Farina and signed the following day on a short-term "until the end of the season" contract. After the Roar failed to make the playoffs, Mori returned to SA to be the player-coach once again of defending South Australian champions Adelaide City.

International career 
Mori made his international debut against Solomon Islands on 4 September 1992. In an international career that spanned over the next ten years, he was capped 45 times and scored 29 goals.

Career statistics

Club

International

Scores and results list Australia's goal tally first, score column indicates score after each Mori goal.

Honours
South Melbourne
 NSL Cup: 1989–90

Adelaide City
 NSL Championship: 1993–94

Perth Glory
 NSL Championship: 2002–03, 2003–04

Australia
 FIFA Confederations Cup runner-up: 1997
 OFC Nations Cup: 1996

Individual:
 Johnny Warren Medal: 1995–96, 2002–03
 NSL top scorer: 1995–96 (31 goals), 1997–98 (19 goals), 1999–2000 (22 goals), 2001–02 (17 goals), 2002–03 (24 goals)

References

External links
 Oz Football profile
 Damian Mori at RSSSF

1970 births
Living people
Soccer players from Melbourne
Australian people of Italian descent
Australian people of Slovenian descent
Australian expatriate soccer players
Australian expatriate sportspeople in Germany
Australia international soccer players
Australian soccer coaches
Olympic soccer players of Australia
A-League Men players
FFSA Super League players
Adelaide City FC players
Borussia Mönchengladbach players
Central Coast Mariners FC players
Melbourne Knights FC players
Perth Glory FC players
Brisbane Roar FC players
South Melbourne FC players
National Soccer League (Australia) players
Caroline Springs George Cross FC players
Bundesliga players
Association football forwards
Australian soccer players
Footballers at the 1992 Summer Olympics
1996 OFC Nations Cup players
1997 FIFA Confederations Cup players
1998 OFC Nations Cup players
2002 OFC Nations Cup players
FK Beograd (Australia) managers
Expatriate footballers in Germany
People from Box Hill, Victoria